Owen Guske (born February 18, 2002) is an American soccer player who plays as a defender for the UCF Knights.

Career

Orlando City
Guske joined the Orlando City academy in 2019, appearing in 15 Development Academy matches in his opening season with the club. In August 2020, Guske made his professional debut with Orlando's USL League One affiliate Orlando City B, starting against New England Revolution II. He was released at the end of the season.

Jacksonville Armada
Ahead of the 2021 NPSL season, Guske signed with Jacksonville Armada U-23. He made his debut for the club on May 12 in a 3-0 victory over Florida Roots FC.

International
In February 2016, Guske was called into a nine-day training camp with the United States U17 team.

References

External links
Owen Guske at US Soccer Development Academy
UCF profile

2002 births
Living people
Orlando City B players
USL League One players
American soccer players
Association football defenders
People from St. Johns County, Florida
Soccer players from Jacksonville, Florida
UCF Knights men's soccer players